The fourth season of the Naruto anime series, titled "4th Stage" in Japan, is directed by Hayato Date, and produced by Studio Pierrot and TV Tokyo. Based on Masashi Kishimoto's manga series, the season follows Naruto and his friends assigning on different short missions, after Sasuke Uchiha joins up with Orochimaru. The episodes aired in Japan from July 6, 2005 to May 3, 2006 on TV Tokyo. 

The English dub was shown on both Cartoon Network's Toonami and YTV's Bionix programming blocks from February 23 to July 26, 2008. 

Sony Pictures Entertainment collected the episodes in a total of twelve DVD volumes, each containing four episodes, between January 1 and December 6, 2006. Only the first three episodes were released by Viz Media in DVD volumes, leaving to DVD boxes that collected the entire series.

Seven pieces of theme music are used in the episodes; three opening themes and four ending themes. The ending themes are "Speed" by Analog Fish (used until episode 154),  by Amadori (used for episodes 155 to 166),  by Chaba (used for episodes 167 to 178), and "Yellow Moon" by Akeboshi (used for episodes 179 to 183). The English version replaces the endings with an instrumental version of "Rise" by Jeremy Sweet and Ian Nickus.


Episode list

References

2005 Japanese television seasons
2006 Japanese television seasons
Naruto episodes